Egor Vasilyevich Kliuka (born 15 June 1995) is a Russian volleyball player of Belarusian descent. He is part of the Russia men's national volleyball team. He competed at the 2015 European Championship. On club level, he plays for Russian club Zenit Saint Petersburg.

Sporting achievements

Clubs
 CEV Cup
  2020/2021 – with Zenit Saint Petersburg

 CEV Challenge Cup
  2015/2016 – with Fakel Novy Urengoy
  2016/2017 – with Fakel Novy Urengoy

Youth national team
 2015  FIVB U23 World Championship

Universiade
 2015  Summer Universiade

National team
 2017  CEV European Championship
 2018  FIVB Nations League
 2019  FIVB Nations League
 2021  Olympic Games

Individual awards
 2015: FIVB U23 World Championship – Most Valuable Player
 2015: FIVB U23 World Championship – Best Outside Spiker
 2019: FIVB Nations League – Best Outside Spiker
 2020: Olympic Games  – Best Outside Spiker

See also
 Russia at the 2015 European Games

References

External links
 Player profile at CEV.eu
 Player profile at WorldofVolley.com
 Player profile at Volleybox.net

1995 births
Living people
People from Kobryn
Russian people of Belarusian descent
Belarusian emigrants to Russia
Russian men's volleyball players
European Games medalists in volleyball
European Games bronze medalists for Russia
Volleyball players at the 2015 European Games
Olympic volleyball players of Russia
Volleyball players at the 2016 Summer Olympics
Universiade medalists in volleyball
Universiade gold medalists for Russia
Medalists at the 2015 Summer Universiade
Volleyball players at the 2020 Summer Olympics
Medalists at the 2020 Summer Olympics
Olympic silver medalists for the Russian Olympic Committee athletes
Olympic medalists in volleyball
Outside hitters
VC Zenit Saint Petersburg players